The Madison County Courthouse in Jackson, Tennessee is a historic Public Works Administratio Moderne-style courthouse built in 1937.  It was listed on the National Register of Historic Places in 1995.

The listing included three contributing objects.

References

County courthouses in Tennessee
National Register of Historic Places in Madison County, Tennessee
Government buildings completed in 1937